Circa is an album by the American composer and pianist Michael Cain, with trumpeter Ralph Alessi and saxophonist Peter Epstein, recorded in 1996 and released on the ECM label.

Reception
The AllMusic review by Scott Yanow stated: "Ranging from what sounds like chamber music (it is often difficult to determine when the musicians are improvising) to stretched-out long tones and heated sections, this episodic and continually intriguing music is never predictable and rewards repeated listenings".

Track listing
All compositions are by Michael Cain, except where indicated.
 "Siegfried and Roy" - 1:26 
 "Social Drones" (Ralph Alessi) - 2:46 
 "Ped Cruc" - 3:27 
 "Miss M." (Alessi) - 6:22 
 "Circa" - 4:20 
 "Egg" - 6:08 
 "Top O' the Dunes" - 7:19 
 "And Their White Tigers" - 4:32 
 "Red Rock Rain" - 4:55 
 "The Suchness of Dory Philpott" (Alessi, Cain) - 4:09 
 "Marche" (Alessi) - 8:20

Personnel
Michael Cain - piano
Ralph Alessi - trumpet, flugelhorn
Peter Epstein - soprano saxophone, tenor saxophone

References

1997 albums
ECM Records albums
Albums produced by Manfred Eicher